Pasha Chay (also Romanized as Pāshā Chāy and Pāshā Chā’ī) is a village in Ijrud-e Pain Rural District, Halab District, Ijrud County, Zanjan Province, Iran. At the 2006 census, its population was 159, in 42 families.

References 

Populated places in Ijrud County